Teeny Shiny is an album by Melt-Banana, released in 2000.

It contains reworkings of two older songs. "First Contact to Planet Q" was previously recorded as "Sham Bazar", and "Warp, Back Spin" was previously recorded as "Crackhead Up or Down". Both of the songs have the same lyrics but are musically different. They appeared on the Japanese compilation CD Lo-Fi ~Electric Acoustic & Radical~, released in 1995.

At the beginning of "Free the Bee" there is a sped-up sample from the 1984 film Repo Man.

Critical reception
The Sunday Times deemed the album "reliably unhinged, old-school Japanese noise madness ... 11 collisions of electric-toothbrush guitars, police-siren solos, Gatling-gun drumming and kindergarten screeching." The Austin American-Statesman wrote that the band "adds a (very) slight pop edge to their usual chaos."

Track listing

References

Melt-Banana albums
2000 albums